The 1958–59 season was Colchester United's 17th season in their history and their ninth season in the third tier of English football, the newly formed national Third Division. Alongside competing in the Third Division, the club also participated in the FA Cup. Colchester reached the fourth round of the FA Cup, beating Bath City, Yeovil Town and Chesterfield on their way to meeting Arsenal. Drawn at home, Colchester held Arsenal to a 2–2 Layer Road draw, but were defeated 4–0 at Highbury in the replay. Colchester finished fifth in the Third Division, nine points shy of promotion.

Season overview
In the new national Third Division, Colchester excelled against their northern counterparts, winning 21 games, more than half of which were clubs previously in the Third Division North. Colchester finished the season in fifth position, just nine points away from Hull City in second place, and ten behind champions Plymouth Argyle. They also earned a club record win when they beat Stockport County 8–2 on 4 October, and a club record away win when they beat Yeovil Town 7–1.

The club's main highlight during the campaign was their FA Cup run, their first venture outside of the first round in six seasons. Colchester defeated old Southern League rivals Bath City and Yeovil Town in the first and second rounds, before seeing off Chesterfield to set up a fourth round tie with Arsenal. For the first time local police set a limit on crowd numbers at Layer Road for the Arsenal game with 16,000 witnessing the 2–2 draw. 62,686 people watched the replay at Highbury in thick fog as the Gunners ran out 4–0 winners.

Both big-money signings from last season, Neil Langman and John Evans, helped repay their transfer fees by scoring 27 and 16 goals respectively. Meanwhile, the proceeds from the Arsenal fixture meant that floodlighting could be installed at Layer Road for the first time.

Players

Transfers

In

Out

Match details

Third Division

Results round by round

League table

Matches

FA Cup

Squad statistics

Appearances and goals

|}

Goalscorers

Clean sheets
Number of games goalkeepers kept a clean sheet.

Player debuts
Players making their first-team Colchester United debut in a fully competitive match.

See also
List of Colchester United F.C. seasons

References

General
Books

Websites

Specific

1958-59
English football clubs 1958–59 season